The Aptera 2 Series (formerly the Aptera Typ-1) was a high-efficiency three-wheeled passenger car designed by Aptera Motors that failed to reach production. 

The first model of the 2 Series slated for production was the Aptera 2e (formerly Typ-1e), a battery electric vehicle announced in late 2008. A later model would have been Aptera 2h (formerly Typ-1h), a plug-in hybrid electric vehicle. According to Aptera, the 2 Series expected price range was £16,000 to £32,000.

An Aptera 2 made a short appearance in the 2009 film Star Trek.

The company opened pre-ordering for residents of California, but stopped taking deposits in July 2011. On 12 August 2011, Aptera announced it would return all deposits from customers who had signed up to buy a car. 

In 2019, Aptera Motors was re-formed by the original founders, Chris Anthony and Steve Fambro, and began developing a much revised solar-powered EV, the Aptera (solar electric vehicle), with up to a 1,600 km range.

Design and fuel consumption
The Aptera 2 Series was designed to be a low-energy vehicle; early estimates of its energy consumption ran as low as 80 watt-hours/mi at 55 mph. Later estimates are as high as 200 Wh for aggressive driving. The company stated in September 2009 that "if Aptera was given an official EPA rating [the fuel-efficiency figure assigned to all cars by the United States federal government], it would be 851 mpg", suggesting that it is 2.2 times more efficient than Nissan Leaf. The Aptera's atypical shape is a result of extensive optimization in a virtual wind tunnel, following the designs of Alberto Morelli. It used recessed windshield wipers and low rolling resistance tires.

A September 2008 Aptera newsletter showed a rendering of the car featuring a conventional driver-side mirror and no driver-side rear-view camera. Aptera CTO Steve Fambro stated that the system was simplified to make use of a single camera mounted near the top of the vehicle.

The body design was similar to Pegasus Research Company's human-powered "Fusion" vehicle (1983) and the MIT Aztec, but the direct inspiration was the Volkswagen 1-litre car.

The Aptera 2 Series was a three-wheeled vehicle with front-wheel drive. On March 23, 2010, Aptera announced their use of BorgWarner's 31-03 eGearDrive transmission for the 2e drive train. An April 14, 2010 press release announced further suppliers: A123 Systems for the 20 kWh lithium iron phosphate (LiFePO4) battery pack, and Remy International for the 82 kW HVH250 electric motor.

They planned to offer an SAE J1772 compatible charging system, at either 110 or 220 V.

Plug-in series hybrid
An early Aptera 2h design used a "small, water-cooled EFI gasoline engine with closed loop oxygen feedback and catalytic converter," coupled with a 12 kW generator/starter. The 2h would have been a series hybrid: The engine would not be connected to the drivetrain, instead being used to recharge the batteries.

As with any plug-in hybrid, fuel economy of the Aptera 2h would depend on trip length and battery charge.  For trips of less than about  after a full charge the engine may not turn on at all, resulting in approximately the same energy consumption as the pure electric model 96 watt-hours/mile. If on the other hand, the car were never plugged in, the Aptera 2h would get .  Aptera Motors quoted , which applies to a  trip after a full charge. They justified this by stating that 99% of Americans drive less than  daily.

Safety
Because the Aptera 2 Series had only three wheels, most American states classify the vehicle as a motorcycle. This means that safety and emissions tests are not mandatory, as they are for cars.

Despite this, Aptera Motors emphasized that safety had a high priority in the vehicle's design. Aptera Motors performed simulated crash tests using Abaqus FEM software, crush testing on structural components, and was planning real-world crash tests before production. The Aptera 2e featured a Formula One-inspired passenger safety cell and boxed sandwich foam core composite structures. As the body is above most cars' bumpers, a colliding vehicle's bumper would travel under the body, deflecting the energy. Despite its height, the placement of the heavy batteries lowered the centre of mass of the Aptera 2 Series, a design similar to the highly stable Commuter Cars Tango. Driver and passenger airbag-in-seatbelts were also provided.

Accessories and interior
It used LED running and interior lights to reduce power consumption. An optional solar panel mounted on the roof runs the heat pump during the day. This keeps the interior comfortable and reduces the size of the heat pump needed. The seats can be heated or cooled by forced air, both for comfort and efficiency reasons. The only comfort downside is that the suspension was described as "hard".

Radio, CD/DVD/MP3 player, and GPS navigation were integrated into an in-console touch screen carputer, based on Moblin by Wind River Systems, but the climate control used physical dials. It also had RFID-based keyless ignition and entry and scarab doors.

To reduce the ecological footprint of construction, EcoSpun recycled materials  and organic dyes were to be used for the seats and flooring, and the dashboard and the door panels were free of heavy metals and plasticizers. Aptera also planned to have leatherette and leather seats as options.

See also
Plug-in electric vehicle
Rumpler Tropfenwagen (1921), first teardrop aerodynamic car
Aurel Persu, improved on Rumpler by placing the wheels inside the car body in 1922-23
List of motorized trikes

References

External links

  Car and Driver Review of Aptera 2e

Electric concept cars
Electric motorcycles
Production electric cars
Plug-in hybrid vehicles
Hybrid electric vehicles
Three-wheeled motor vehicles